HMS Prince Charles was the name of two ships in the Royal Navy:
 HMS Prince Charles was a Q ship in World War I, the first to successfully sink a submarine.
  was a ferry taken into military service as a Landing Ship, Infantry during the Second World War.

Royal Navy ship names